John Zube (born June 1933) is a German-Australian libertarian activist and founder of the Libertarian Microfiche Publishing project.

Born in Berlin, Germany, Zube was introduced to libertarianism by his father, Kurt Zube, a prominent individualist anarchist persecuted under the Nazis. During the 1950s, Zube was radicalized by his interaction with Ulrich von Beckerath, leading him to begin assembly of an archive in 1952.

Zube, who identifies as an individualist anarchist, free-market libertarian, voluntaryist and mutualist, is well known for his advocacy of panarchism, a political philosophy originating with Paul Émile de Puydt which emphasizes each individual's right to freely join and leave the jurisdiction of any governments they choose, without being forced to move from their current locale.

Libertarian Microfiche Publishing
Zube founded the Libertarian Microfiche Publishing (LMP) in 1978 with the goal of collecting and cheaply reproducing libertarian materials. As of 2005, the project had scanned over 500,000 pages onto microfiche, making slides available for $1 apiece. Zube claims to have published and circulated more libertarian literature than any other person in the world during the 20th century.

In 2007, Shawn P. Wilbur used microfiche obtained from Zube to release the first full-text digital archive of Liberty, the prominent individualist periodical published by Benjamin R. Tucker between 1881 and 1908.

In 2016, Kevin I. Slaughter launched UnionOfEgoists.com  website and has scanned hundreds of pages of microfiche and host the content online, including journals from Sidney Parker (anarchist), and others associated with Egoist anarchism and Individualist anarchism. In August of that year he put the Libertarian Microfiche index back online at LibertarianMicrofiche.com.

References

External links
 LibertarianMicrofiche.com - a site hosting the index to Peace Plans
 Panarchy.org
 ReinventingMoney.com - a site hosting the work of Thomas Greco, E.C. Riegel, John Zube, and others.

1933 births
Living people
Anarchist theorists
Australian anarchists
Australian libertarians
Free-market anarchists
German anarchists
German libertarians
Individualist anarchists
Libertarian theorists
Mutualists
People from Berlin
Voluntaryists